The Cardiff Australian Football Club, nicknamed the Hawks, is an Australian rules football club based in the City of Lake Macquarie suburb of Cameron Park, New South Wales and currently plays in the AFL Hunter Central Coast competition.

History 
The club was established on 14 November 1967 at a meeting at the Evans Oval Soccer Hall by former pupils at the Cardiff High school. They first began playing football in 1968 entering a team in the Newcastle Australian Football League Reserve grade competition. In their first season they had finished runners up, losing the Grand Final by just one point. After winning the premiership the following year in 1969, Cardiff was added to the league's First Grade competition. At the time the club was playing on a field which is now known today as McDonald Jones Stadium.

Cardiff improved quickly within the First Grade competition, making their first Grand Final in 1974 despite losing to RAAF. In 1978 the Hawks moved to their new home ground of Maneela Park in Glendale. Under the coaching of former Glenelg footballer Neil Davis, Cardiff won their first NAFL First Grade premiership over Newcastle City, and went on to win the following year in 1980 after lasting the entire season undefeated. Cardiff finished runners up in the following 1981 and 1982 seasons, losing both Grand Finals to Newcastle City and Western Suburbs. However, this would see a premiership drought lasting for 18 years until 1998 when a year after they finished runners up again, this time to Nelson Bay, they capped off another undefeated season to win the premiership.

After both the Newcastle and Central Coast leagues merged to form the Black Diamond Australian Football League in 2000, Cardiff were seen as one of the more stronger clubs inn the league early on, despite losing both the 2000 and 2001 Grand Finals to Terrigal-Avoca and West Newcastle-Wallsend. The Hawks won the 2002 premiership and went on to win the 2004, 2005 and 2006 flags but after 2007 saw a Grand Final losing streak that lasted from 2008 to 2012. 2006 saw the club lose Maneela Park, which resulted in seniors playing at Bill Elliott Oval and juniors at Hillsborough Oval. Cardiff's most recent First Grade Grand Final appearance was in 2017 where they lost to Terrigal-Avoca by 9 points.

Cardiff fielded their first Women's team in 2016 that finished their inaugural season 4th with 11 wins and 4 losses. In 2021, Cardiff introduced a second women's team which will compete in the Plate division.

Cardiff has produced one Australian Football League player, Isaac Heeney who was drafted by Sydney Swans in the 2014 AFL National Draft.

Honour Board 

^ Undefeated season

# 2nd Division

References

External links 
 

1967 establishments in Australia
Australian rules football clubs established in 1967
Australian rules football clubs in New South Wales
Sport in Newcastle, New South Wales